Asa Asika is a Nigerian talent manager, best known as Davido's manager, also the co-founder of The Plug (subsidiaries; The Plug Entertainment, The Plug Music, and Plug Sports) and Mainland Block Party.

Early life
Asa Asika was born on 14 August 1990, and is the oldest out of three siblings. His mother died when he was seven years old.

Career
Asika began his career at Storm 360, working at shows for Obi Asika, when he was sixteen, until 2012, when his uncle, and Olisa Adibua ended their partnership. At Storm 360, he worked with Ikechukwu, ELDee, Sasha P, Naeto C, and became talent manager to YQ, and other clients including R2Bees and Davido. In 2013, he founded his entertainment management company, StarGaze Management Company, after he split with Davido. In 2014, he signed Naeto C, Boj, a member of the musical group DRB LasGidi, and Ayo Jay, to StarGaze Management Company. In 2016, he founded The Plug Entertainment (aka The Plug), a management firm. In 2017, he became Davido manager again, under The Plug Entertainment. He won Artiste Manager of the Year at The Beatz Awards 2019, and 2018 City People Music Awards.  On 22 March 2021, he received multiple plaques from RIAA for Davido, and Ayo Jay.

Personal life
He is the nephew of Obi Asika, and cousin to Naeto C.  In January 2018, his relationship with Cuppy, became public, and ended in 2020.

Awards and nominations

References 

1990 births
Nigerian music industry executives
Living people